The Old Song is a 1930 German drama film directed by Erich Waschneck and starring Lil Dagover, Lien Deyers, and Igo Sym. The film's sets were designed by the art directors Heinz Fenchel and Jacek Rotmil.

Cast

References

Bibliography

External links 
 

1930 films
Films of the Weimar Republic
German comedy-drama films
1930 comedy-drama films
1930s German-language films
Films directed by Erich Waschneck
German black-and-white films
1930s German films